Francisco Rita is a São Toméan politician. He is serving as Minister of Trade, Industry and Tourism.

References

Year of birth missing (living people)
Living people
Government ministers of São Tomé and Príncipe